Petrus Compton also known by his nickname, "Papo", is a Saint Lucian politician and senator. He was the Foreign Minister of Saint Lucia from October 26, 2004, when he was appointed to succeed Julian Hunte, until December 2006, when a new government took office. Compton was previously the attorney general and minister of justice from July 1997 to October 2004, until he became Minister of Foreign Affairs.

Compton is a graduate of the University of the West Indies, Mona, Jamaica, where he received a bachelor's degree in English, and the Cave Hill, Barbados, campus where he obtained his Bachelor of Laws degree (LLB).  Mr. Compton pursued graduate studies at the University College London which culminated in the award of the Master of Laws degree (LLM).  He was called to the British Bar at Gray's Inn in London.

References

Living people
University of the West Indies alumni
Alumni of University College London
Government ministers of Saint Lucia
Members of the Senate of Saint Lucia
20th-century Saint Lucian lawyers
Foreign Ministers of Saint Lucia
Year of birth missing (living people)
Saint Lucia Labour Party politicians